The Erivan uezd was a county (uezd) of the Erivan Governorate of the Caucasus Viceroyalty of the Russian Empire. The uezd bordered the Etchmiadzin and Surmalu uezds to the west, the Nor Bayazet uezd to the east, the Sharur-Daralayaz uezd to the south, and Iran to the southwest. It included most of the Ararat Province and southern parts of the Kotayk Province of central Armenia, the Sadarak District of the Nakhchivan exclave of Azerbaijan, and the Aras corridor of the Aralık District of the Iğdır Province of Turkey. The administrative centre of the county was the city of Erivan (present-day Yerevan, the capital of Armenia).

Economy 
The population was engaged primarily in agricultural farming, gardening, and winemaking.  Approximately 50% of the wine in the Erivan Governorate was produced in the Erivan uezd. According to statistical data, there were 129,120 great cattle in the uezd, which made up 11% of the cattle in the whole governorate.

Geography
The northeastern part of the uezd was mountainous and rocky while the southwestern part consisted of steppes and plains. Among the rivers discharging into the Aras were the Zanga, the Garni-chay, and the Vedi-chay, which usually dried out during the summers and became active in the winters.

History
The territory of the uezd had been a part of Persia's Erivan Khanate until 1828, when according to the Treaty of Turkmenchay, it was annexed to the Russian Empire.  It was administered as part of the Armenian Oblast from 1828 to 1840.  In 1844, the Caucasus Viceroyalty was re-established, in which the territory of the Erivan uezd formed part of the Tiflis Governorate.  In 1849, the Erivan Governorate was established, separate from the Tiflis Governorate.

In 1918, the uezd became a part of the First Republic of Armenia, partially being occupied by the Ottoman army through much of 1918 as a result of the Treaty of Batum until its reincorporation into Armenian administration in the December of 1918. Many of the Azerbaijanis in the southern rural portions of the uezd, particularly in centers including Böyük Vedi (Vedi), Davalu (Ararat) and Ulukhanlu–Zangibasar (Masis) after being prompted by Kemalist Turkish agents engaged in rebellion against the Armenian government, hostilities lasting from July 1919 until the Sovietization of Armenia.

After the establishment of Soviet power on 3 December 1920, most of the uezd formed part of the Armenian SSR, the center Erivan (Yerevan) serving as the new government's capital. The southernmost parts of the uezd corresponding to the locality of Sadarak became the northernmost section of the new Nakhichevan ASSR of the Azerbaijan SSR and the outer southwestern strip of the uezd, corresponding to the Aras corridor on the west bank of the Aras river, was ceded to Turkey in accordance with the treaties of Moscow and Kars.

Administrative divisions 
The subcounties (uchastoks) of the Erivan uezd in 1913 were as follows:

Demographics

Russian Empire Census 

The majority of the population indicated Tatar  to be their mother tongue, with significant Armenian and Kurdish speaking minorities.

Kavkazskiy kalendar 

The statistics indicated an overwhelmingly Armenian population in the capital Erivan, with a significant Shia Muslim population, conversely, in the rural peripheries of the district, the population had a Shia Muslim plurality with a significant Armenian minority:

Settlements 
According to the 1897 census, there were 82 settlements in the Erivan uezd with a population over 500 inhabitants. The religious composition of the settlements was as follows:

Notes

References

Bibliography 

History of Yerevan
Ararat Province
Kotayk Province
Uezds of Erivan Governorate